The following highways are numbered 349:

Canada
Manitoba Provincial Road 349
 Nova Scotia Route 349
Prince Edward Island Route 349
 Quebec Route 349
Saskatchewan Highway 349

Japan
 Japan National Route 349

United States
  Arkansas Highway 349
  Connecticut Route 349
  Florida State Road 349
  County Road 349 (Dixie County, Florida)
  Georgia State Route 349 (former)
  Maryland Route 349
 New York:
  New York State Route 349
  County Route 349 (Erie County, New York)
  Ohio State Route 349
  Pennsylvania Route 349
  Puerto Rico Highway 349
 Texas:
  Texas State Highway 349
  Farm to Market Road 349
  Virginia State Route 349